Mackville may refer to several places in the United States:

 Mackville, Kentucky
 Mackville, Missouri
 Mackville, Wisconsin